The Újpest Synagogue is a Neolog Judaism synagogue in Újpest (New Pest), a district of Budapest, Hungary. The Romantic-style edifice was built in 1866 and holds 1,000 seats.  Rabbi Sander Rosenberg from Arad officiated at the opening ceremony.  Its establishment was a "great holiday" for the Jews and Christians of Újpest. It lies in 8 Gergely Berzeviczy Street about five minutes from Újpest-Városkapu metro station.

The synagogue was founded by the Lowy family.

The Orthodox Judaism community, which did not agree with Neolog Judaism, split off and created their own synagogue. 

During World War II, the synagogue was looted and partially destroyed by the Nazis.  After the war the synagogue was rebuilt and a Holocaust memorial was added next to the synagogue.  The memorial, which was unveiled by Hungarian President Zoltán Tildy, is a wall with names of the 17,000 Jewish Ujpest residents that were victims of the Holocaust.

See also 
 Dohány Street Synagogue

References

External links 
 Pic of building model
Neolog Synagogue in Újpest from the Bezalel Narkiss Index of Jewish Art, Center for Jewish Art, Hebrew University of Jerusalem

Neolog Judaism synagogues
Synagogues in Budapest
Újpest
Synagogues completed in 1866
1866 establishments in the Austrian Empire